Birgül Güler (born ) is a Turkish female former volleyball player, playing as a right side hitter. She was part of the Turkey women's national volleyball team.

She competed at the 2013 Women's European Volleyball Championship. On club level she played for Nilüfer Bursa.

References

External links
http://www.cev.lu/competition-area/PlayerDetails.aspx?TeamID=8616&PlayerID=42780&ID=701
http://www.scoresway.com/?sport=volleyball&page=player&id=8187

1990 births
Living people
Turkish women's volleyball players
Place of birth missing (living people)